CarePoint Health Bayonne Medical Center is a hospital in Bayonne, New Jersey. It has 278 beds and was founded in 1888.
One of six hospitals in Hudson County,  the Bayonne Medical Center is affiliated with Hoboken University Medical Center and Christ Hospital, which are also operated by the for-profit organization Hudson Hospital Opco.

The hospital became the subject of media coverage in 2013 when, in the midst of nationwide controversy over inconsistent hospital charges, The New York Times reported that the hospital "charged the highest amounts in the country for nearly one-quarter of the most common hospital treatments", which the Times associated with its 2008 restructuring after being acquired out of bankruptcy the previous year. In the same year, the hospital was ordered to award a "whistleblower" $2.1 million for being fired.

According to a study conducted by National Nurses United and released in January 2014, the hospital was the 9th most expensive in the state, charging 763% above costs.

Bayonne Medical Center entered the national spotlight again in 2014, when an investigative news team at NBC 4 New York reported that the hospital charged a New Jersey teacher nearly US$9,000 to bandage his middle finger. In 2015 a follow-up investigation covered the story of a Bayonne resident who was charged over $17,000 for stitches on a two-inch cut.

The sale of hospital and the property on which it is located has been a matter of controversy. The city has considered eminent domain to settle the matter.

References

External links

Hospital buildings completed in 1888
Hospitals in Hudson County, New Jersey
Bayonne, New Jersey
Hospitals established in 1888